Präbichl Sattel (el. 1226 m.) is a high mountain pass in the Austrian Alps within the Bundesland of Styria.

See also
 List of highest paved roads in Europe
 List of mountain passes

Mountain passes of Styria
Prabitchl